Sacrament was a Christian progressive thrash metal band from Philadelphia, Pennsylvania, United States, formed in 1989. Their music was known for its evangelistic lyrics, and they often played to secular audiences. Sacrament is one of the pioneers of Christian thrash metal, along with Living Sacrifice. When they broke up in 1994, members DiDonato and Ney formed Fountain of Tears with members of Believer. 

In April 2021, Paul Graham and Mike Torone, two original members of Sacrament, started a new band, Testimony of Apocalypse. The lineup includes Paul Graham (drums), Mike Torone (vocals) and Nick Pacitti (guitars, bass, keyboards).  Their first single Redemption was released September 2021 by The Charon Collective record label.

Discography
Studio albums
 Testimony of Apocalypse (1989, R.E.X.)
 Haunts of Violence (1992, R.E.X.)
EPs
 Presumed Dead (1989)

Members
Last Known Line-up
Robert Wolfe – vocals
Mike DiDonato – guitars
Erik Ney – bass guitar
Paul Graham – drums
Brian Toy – guitar
Former
Mike Torone – vocals

References

Notes
HM Magazine Issue No. 37 (1992)

External links
Sacrament at BNR Metal

Sacrament at MySpace

American Christian metal musical groups
American thrash metal musical groups
Heavy metal musical groups from Pennsylvania
Musical groups established in 1989
Musical groups disestablished in 1994
Musical groups from Philadelphia